Rita Cadillac (born Nicole Yasterbelsky; 18 May 1936, Paris – 4 April 1995, Deauville) was a French dancer, singer, and actress.

Cadillac started her music career as an accordionist under the alias "Rita Rella" at the age of 13. In 1952, she was a pin-up model and took the name "Rita Cadillac" at Crazy Horse where she began to work as an exotic dancer. She was also a dancer of Folies Bergère in the 1950s.

Cadillac appeared in many French films such as Soirs de Paris (1954), Porte océane (1958), La prostitution (1962), Un clair de lune à Maubeuge (1962), and Any Number Can Win (1963), becoming a renowned figure throughout Europe. In 1981, she appeared in the miniseries and film Das Boot, as the club singer Monique, in the town of La Rochelle.

Selected filmography
Prostitution (1963)

References

External links 

1936 births
1995 deaths
20th-century French actresses
Actresses from Paris
Deaths from cancer in France
French female erotic dancers
French film actresses
Singers from Paris
20th-century French women singers